Tomás "Tom" de Paor  (born 1967) is an Irish architect and member of Aosdána, an Irish association of artists.

Early life
De Paor was born in London in 1967 and grew up in County Clare.

Architecture

de Paor studied architecture at TU Dublin (1985–88) and in UCD (1989–91), where he graduated with first class honours. In 1991 he won (with Emma O’Neill) the international competition for the design of a reception building at the Royal Gunpowder Mills at Ballincollig, County Cork, a building which won an AAI award in 1993 and an RIAI award in 1994.

Since then his public work has included works to the A13 in Barking and Dagenham in London (1996), the National Sculpture Factory Cork (1998), Comhdháil Naisiúnta na Gaeilge Dublin (1999), Clontarf Pumpstation and landscape (2007), Irish Aid Centre Dublin (2008), Druid Theatre Galway (2009),  Landside Bar Dublin airport (2011) and the Pálás cinema in Galway (2017), which was awarded an AAI and RIAI award for Best Cultural Building, two Irish Concrete Society awards, two Civic Trust awards and a World Architecture Award. He has also designed various one off houses and gardens, both urban and rural, across the island of Ireland.

In 2000 he was invited to design the inaugural Irish representation at the Venice Architecture Biennale  and he contributed to subsequent Irish Pavilions in 2006, 2008 and in 2010, which he co-curated. He exhibited in the international pavilion in 2010 and 2018.

He represented Europe in New Trends of Architecture Europe and Japan in 2001.

In 2003, he was elected a Fellow of the Royal Institute of the Architects of Ireland and voted Young Architect of the Year by Building Design and Corus. In 2015 he was elected to Aosdána, and in 2017 became an International Fellow of the Royal Institute of British Architects, only the third Irish architect to receive that honour; he was described as "the leading Irish architect of his generation."

In 2022 dePaor staged the exhibition ‘i see Earth: building and ground: 1991–2021’, supported by the Arts Council of Ireland, The Irish Architecture Foundation, Visual Carlow, and curated by N. Weadick.

He works with Peter Maybury under the imprint Gall.

Teaching 
He has been an invited lecturer and critic internationally,  teaching at UCD since graduation and various schools including Pontificia Universidad Catolica, Santiago, Chile, the Porto Academy, and the Harvard Graduate School of Design where he was Design Critic from 2016-21

Personal life

de Paor lives and works in Greystones,Co.Wicklow.

Bibliography 

 ‘N3’, 
 ‘Circle Book’, Gall edition the Office of Public Works, at Chancery Street, Dublin.
 ‘Reservoir’, Gall edition, 
 ‘Irlanda’, Gall edition, 
 ‘Of’, Gall edition, 
 'desert’, the Notations series University of Ulster, Gall edition,

References

External links
 

1967 births
Aosdána members
20th-century Irish architects
21st-century Irish architects
Alumni of University College Dublin
People from County Clare
Living people